This is a list of Elite Ice Hockey League seasons since its inception:

2003–04 | 
2004–05 | 
2005–06 | 
2006–07 | 
2007–08 | 
2008–09 | 
2009–09 | 
2010–09 | 
2011–12 | 
2012–13 | 
2013–14 | 
2014–15 | 
2015–16 | 
2016–17 | 
2017–18 |

References
Historic standings and statistics - at Internet Hockey Database